Three Witnesses is a 1935 British crime film directed by Leslie S. Hiscott and starring Henry Kendall, Eve Gray and Sebastian Shaw. It was made at Twickenham Studios as a quota quickie. The screenplay concerns a man who arrested on suspicion of murdering his brother.

Premise
After one of the partners in a haulage company is murdered, his brother is arrested on suspicion of the crime. A solicitor sets out to prove his innocence.

Cast
 Henry Kendall as Leslie Trent  
 Eve Gray as Margaret Truscott  
 Sebastian Shaw as Roger Truscott  
 Garry Marsh as Charles Rowton  
 Gerald Pring as Mark Boddington
 Richard Cooper as Claude Pember  
 Geraldine Fitzgerald as Diane Morton  
 Noel Dryden as Cyril Truscott  
 Ralph Truman as Mr Albert Bellman
 Gladys Hamer as Mrs. Bellman 
 Gerald Hamer
 Henry Wolston

References

Bibliography
 Low, Rachael. Filmmaking in 1930s Britain. George Allen & Unwin, 1985.
 Wood, Linda. British Films, 1927-1939. British Film Institute, 1986.

External links

1935 films
British crime films
1935 crime films
1930s English-language films
Films directed by Leslie S. Hiscott
Films shot at Twickenham Film Studios
Films set in England
Films set in London
Quota quickies
British black-and-white films
1930s British films